This is a sortable list of American football sports video games.

Platforms: Arcade, PC, Commodore Amiga, Commodore 64, Commodore 128, Dartmouth Time Sharing System, Atari ST, Atari Lynx, Apple II, Apple IIGS, TurboGrafx-16, Amstrad CPC, ZX Spectrum, Intellivision, Atari 2600, Atari 5200, Atari 8-bit, MSX, Family Computer, Nintendo Entertainment System, Super Nintendo Entertainment System, 32X, Sega Genesis, Sega CD, Master System, Game Gear, 3DO Interactive Multiplayer, Atari Jaguar, Nintendo 64, GameCube, Wii, Wii U, Game Boy, Game Boy Color, Game Boy Advance, Game Boy Advance SP, Tapwave Zodiac, Nintendo DS, Virtual Console, Microsoft Windows, macOS, Macintosh, MS-DOS, DOS, N-Gage, OS X, Palm Pre, PlayStation, PlayStation 2, PlayStation 3, PlayStation 4, PlayStation 5, PlayStation Portable, PlayStation Vita, Sega Saturn, Dreamcast, Windows Mobile, Xbox Live Arcade, Xbox, Xbox 360, Xbox One, iOS, Nintendo 3DS, Android, Mobile phone, Mobile game, BlackBerry, BlackBerry PlayBook, Magnavox Odyssey

Franchises
 Arena Football
 Backyard Football
 Joe Montana Football
 Madden NFL
 NCAA Football
 NCAA Gamebreaker
 NFL 2K
 NFL Blitz
 NFL Fever
 NFL GameDay
 NFL Quarterback Club
 NFL Street
 Tecmo Bowl

Games

See also
American football
Video games

References

American Football